Hydroxystenozole, also known as 17α-methylandrost-4-eno[3,2-c]pyrazol-17β-ol, is an orally active androgen/anabolic steroid (AAS) and a 17α-alkylated derivative of testosterone that was described in the literature in 1967 but was never marketed. It is closely related to stanozolol (17α-methyl-5α-androstano[3,2-c]pyrazol-17β-ol), differing from it only in hydrogenation (i.e., double bonds and their placement).

References

Abandoned drugs
1-Methylcyclopentanols
Androgens and anabolic steroids
Androstanes
Pyrazoles